Addison Taylor McCain (born August 28, 1999) is an American professional soccer player who plays as a midfielder for Chicago Red Stars in the National Women's Soccer League (NWSL).

Early life

FC Dallas Academy
Addie McCain joined the FC Dallas Juniors' team at age 7. Throughout the next 11 years, she guided her teams to conference championships, consistently playing up divisions. At the U-14 level, her team was ranked No. 3 in the nation. She spent her last seasons with the FC Dallas Women's Premier Soccer League team.

Wylie East High School
In 2015, as a sophomore, she led Wylie East High School to the 5A State Championship and was named the tournament MVP; scoring 19 goals the following season.

Texas A&M
Addie McCain graduated high school early to enroll at Texas A&M where she attended from 2017 to 2020. While making 75 caps with 66 starts she received several honors throughout her college career; including 2017 SEC All-Freshman Team, 2018 All-SEC Second Team, 2020 All-SEC First Team, 2020 SEC Midfielder of the Year. She graduated early to prepare for the professional game.

Club career

Kansas City Current
McCain was selected by NWSL club Kansas City Current as the 17th overall pick of the 2021 NWSL Draft. She signed a two year deal with the team in March 2021 and made her professional debut on April 26, 2021 against the Houston Dash. McCain scored her first goal for the Kansas City Current on March 18, 2022 in the 78th minute of the opening match of the 2022 NWSL Challenge Cup against Racing Louisville FC to bring the game to a 1–1 tie, which was the final score of the game.

References

External links 
 NWSL Stats
 Kansas City player profile
 Instagram
 Twitter
 Texas A&M player profile

1999 births
Living people
Texas A&M Aggies women's soccer players
American women's soccer players
Kansas City Current draft picks
Kansas City Current players
National Women's Soccer League players
21st-century American women
Women's association football midfielders